Park Cho-rong (born 20 February 1988) is a South Korean footballer who plays as a defender. She has been a member of the South Korea women's national team.

References

1988 births
Living people
South Korean women's footballers
Women's association football defenders
WK League players
South Korea women's under-17 international footballers
South Korea women's international footballers